The 2019 Q School was a series of three snooker tournaments held during the 2019–20 snooker season. An event for amateur players, it served as a qualification event for a place on the professional World Snooker Tour for the following two seasons. The events took place in May and June 2019 at the Robin Park Leisure Centre in Wigan, England. The event was organised by World Snooker, with entries for the event costing £1,000 but with no maximum number of participants.

Each tournament is split into four paths, with the winner of each path being awarded a place on the World Snooker Tour for the 2019–20 season and the 2020–21 snooker season. Twelve players qualified from the events: Chen Zifan, Riley Parsons, Louis Heathcote, Fraser Patrick, Xu Si, David Lilley, Jamie O'Neill, Soheil Vahedi, Barry Pinches, Alex Borg, Alexander Ursenbacher and Andy Hicks. Four more players: Si Jiahui, Billy Joe Castle, Peter Lines and Lei Peifan; were also given tour cards for being at the top of the Order of Merit. The highest break of the events was a 137 made by both Xu Si in event one and Lucky Vatnani in event two.

Format 
The Q School is a series of three snooker tournaments, featuring as a qualification route for the World Snooker Tour. First played in 2011, each event consisted of players being randomly assigned to four sections. The 2019 events were played at the Robin Park Leisure Centre in Wigan, England. Each section played in the knockout system with the winner of each section earning a two-year tour card to play on the World Snooker Tour for the 2019–20 snooker season and 2020–21 snooker season. Four more players also received places on the tour based on the Order of Merit, based on the number of frames won over the three events. All matches were played as the best of seven . Events had no maximum participants, but entries cost £1,000.

Summary
The first event was held between 18 and 23 May. Paul Davison and Soheil Vahedi were tied at 3–3 and was decided on the final ,  by Vahedi. In the final round, David Lilley completed a whitewash over Sean Maddocks to win a tour card for the first time. Xu Si, who had been demoted from the tour the previous season, defeated fellow Chinese player Wang Zepeng 4–2. During the match Xu made the highest break of the tournament, a 137. Jamie O'Neill defeated Kleckers 4–1, whilst Vahedi beat Ross Bulman 4–2.

The second event was held between 24 and 29 May. In the opening round, Lucky Vatnani made the highest break of the event, a 137, but still lost 4–2 to Long Zehuang. The qualification round saw Chen Zifan complete a whitewash 4–0 win over Au Chi-wai from Hong Kong, Riley Parsons defeat Peter Lines 4–3 and Fraser Patrick beat Sydney Watson 4–3. Patrick likened the experience of playing in the event as "every match is like going 12 rounds with Anthony Joshua". In the final qualification match, Si Jiahui led Louis Heathcote 3–0, who also required snookers in frame four and five, but still lost 4–3.

The third and final event was held between 30 May and 4 June. In the qualification round, Barry Pinches defeated Long 4–3, and 1995 World Snooker Championship semi-finalist Andy Hicks defeated Yang Qingtian 4–0. Alex Borg, Malta's second most successful player after Tony Drago, defeated Billy Joe Castle 4–1 and Alexander Ursenbacher beat Peter Lines 4–3. Both Castle and Lines already had enough frames won to qualify for the main tour before these matches occurred. The final two qualification tour cards were awarded to Si Jiahui and Peifan Lei.

Order of Merit
The Order of Merit was awarded to players who won the most frames across the three events who didn't qualify automatically from the events. The top 30 players are shown below, those with Q in brackets were awarded places on the World Snooker Tour.

References

External links
 

Snooker amateur tournaments